White Stone Lake is a lake in Chisago County, Minnesota, in the United States.

White Stone Lake was named from the white stones, large and small, found on its lake bed.

See also
List of lakes in Minnesota

References

Lakes of Minnesota
Lakes of Chisago County, Minnesota